Rear Admiral Derek Christian  is a South African Navy officer, currently serving as Deputy Chief of Joint Operations Division (Special Forces) as from 1 April 2016. He is the former Director of Naval Logistics.

Military career 
After completing school at Grey High School in Port Elizabeth he joined the Navy in 1975. He completed a BMil degree at the Military Academy and then joined the Strike Craft flotilla before volunteering for submarines in 1980.

He attended the US Naval War College from 1996 to 1997. After returning to South Africa he was appointed as the Naval Attache in Washington.

He became the 17th Commandant of the South African Military Academy in 2006 and was promoted to rear admiral (junior grade) from May 2006. In April 2009 he was posted to Naval Headquarters and assumed the post of Director Naval Logistics in 2011.

He was appointed Deputy Chief of Joint Operations in April 2016 and appointed acting Chief of Joint Operations in October 2016. He is due to retire on 28 February 2017.

Honours and awards
He completed an MBA at the University of Cape Town as well as an MA in International Relations from Salve Regina University.
His medals include the Military Merit Medal and the Legion of Merit from the United States as well as the Tamandare Medal of Merit

List

References

Living people
South African admirals
Alumni of Grey High School
Naval War College alumni
Salve Regina University alumni
Foreign recipients of the Legion of Merit
Year of birth missing (living people)
Military attachés